Charles Scott Dickson FRSE LLD (13 September 1850, Glasgow – 5 August 1922) was a Scottish Unionist politician and judge.

Life
Charles was born in Glasgow the son of Dr John Robert Dickson. His elder brother was James Douglas Hamilton Dickson.

Educated at the High School of Glasgow, the University of Glasgow and the University of Edinburgh he was admitted to the bar as an advocate in 1877.

He was an unsuccessful candidate for Kilmarnock Burghs in 1892, and Glasgow Bridgeton in 1895 and 1897. He was elected to and sat for Bridgeton from 1900 until 1906, when he was defeated. He then sat for Glasgow Central from March 1909 until his appointment as a judge in 1915.

He rose to be Solicitor General for Scotland from 14 May 1896 to 1903 and as Lord Advocate from 1903 to 1905. From 1908 to 1915, he served as the elected Dean of the Faculty of Advocates. He was appointed a Privy Counsellor in 1903. On 1 July 1915 he was raised to the bench as Lord Justice Clerk, taking the judicial title Lord Dickson. He was also a Justice of the Peace and a Deputy Lord Lieutenant for Edinburgh.

He was elected a Fellow of the Royal Society of Edinburgh in 1884. His proposers were Sir James Dewar, John Chiene, Alexander Crum Brown, and Peter Guthrie Tait.

In later life he lived at 22 Moray Place a huge Georgian townhouse on the Moray Estate in Edinburgh's affluent West End.

He is buried in the 20th century extension to Dean Cemetery in Edinburgh with his wife Hester Bagot Banks(d.1934). The monument stands against the north wall.

He was related through marriage to Sir James Dewar (their wives were sisters).

References

External links 
 

1850 births
1922 deaths
People educated at the High School of Glasgow
Members of the Parliament of the United Kingdom for Glasgow constituencies
Dickson
Lord Advocates
Solicitors General for Scotland
Unionist Party (Scotland) MPs
Alumni of the University of Edinburgh
Alumni of the University of Glasgow
UK MPs 1900–1906
UK MPs 1906–1910
UK MPs 1910
UK MPs 1910–1918
Members of the Faculty of Advocates
Fellows of the Royal Society of Edinburgh
Politicians from Glasgow
Members of the Privy Council of the United Kingdom
Deans of the Faculty of Advocates
Members of the Judicial Committee of the Privy Council
Scottish Tory MPs (pre-1912)
Lawyers from Glasgow